Eusebio Guiñazú (born 15 January 1982) is an Argentine rugby union player. His usual position is as a prop or hooker.

History

Club career
He started his career at Argentine team RC Mendoza.

He turned professional in 2005 and signed for the French Top 14 team Toulon. After just one season at Toulon, he moved to another French team, Agen, where he remained for 3 seasons until he was released in July 2009 due to club's financial problems following their relegation to Pro D2.

He played for them during the 2010 Super 14 season, as well as for domestic side  in the 2010 Vodacom Cup and 2010 Currie Cup First Division seasons.

At the end of 2010, he returned to France when he joined Biarritz and shortly after moved to Toulouse.

He signed for Bath Rugby on a two-year deal in November 2012.

He joined Irish Pro12 side Munster on a four-month contract in September 2014. He signed a contract extension with Munster in January 2015, meaning he will stay with the province until the end of the 2014–2015 season.

International career
In 2003, while still playing in Argentina, he earned a call-up to the Argentina national team, making his debut on 27 April against  in Montevideo.

He was not initially named to the Argentina squad for the 2007 Rugby World Cup, but was called in for the third-place match against France as a replacement for the injured Mario Ledesma.

In 2012 Eusebio was part of the Pumas team that part in the inaugural, The Rugby Championship.

References

External links
 Munster Profile
 L'Equipe profile
 

1982 births
Argentine rugby union players
Living people
Rugby union hookers
Rugby union props
Biarritz Olympique players
Bath Rugby players
Argentina international rugby union players
Sportspeople from Mendoza, Argentina
Stormers players
Boland Cavaliers players
Stade Toulousain players
RC Toulonnais players
SU Agen Lot-et-Garonne players
Munster Rugby players